Raoul Savoy (born 18 May 1973) is a Spanish-Swiss football coach.

Career
In 2012, he spent for the first time in Algeria managing MC Oran and in 2013 MC El Eulma.

On 15 May 2015, Raoul was appointed the manager of Gambia national football team. He quit in December 2015.

In February 2017 he was one of a number of managers on the shortlist for the vacant Rwanda national team manager role. He later became manager of Central African Republic staying until March 2019.

References

External links
  Raoul Savoy profile - eurosport.fr
 Raoul Savoy Interview
 Raoul Savoy Interview with Laregion.ch

1973 births
Living people
Swiss football managers
COD Meknès managers
SCC Mohammédia managers
Ittihad Tanger managers
Ethiopia national football team managers
Eswatini national football team managers
MC Oran managers
MC El Eulma managers
FC Sion non-playing staff
Central African Republic national football team managers
Expatriate football managers in Cameroon
Expatriate football managers in Morocco
Expatriate football managers in Ethiopia
Expatriate football managers in Eswatini
Expatriate football managers in Algeria
Expatriate football managers in the Central African Republic
French expatriate sportspeople in Cameroon
French expatriate sportspeople in Morocco
French expatriate sportspeople in Algeria
French expatriate sportspeople in the Gambia
French expatriate sportspeople in Eswatini
French expatriate sportspeople in the Central African Republic
French expatriate sportspeople in Ethiopia
Expatriate football managers in the Gambia